The Nehawka Public Library in Nehawka, Nebraska was listed on the National Register of Historic Places in 2002.

It is a log cabin-style building which was built as a Civil Works Administration project in 1934.

It is located at the southeast corner of Elm Street and Maple Avenue in Nehawka.

References

External links

Log buildings and structures on the National Register of Historic Places in Nebraska
Libraries on the National Register of Historic Places in Nebraska
National Register of Historic Places in Cass County, Nebraska
Library buildings completed in 1934
1934 establishments in Nebraska
New Deal in Nebraska
Civil Works Administration